The 2009 UST Growling Tigers men's basketball team represented University of Santo Tomas in the 72nd season of the University Athletic Association of the Philippines. The men's basketball tournament for the school year 2009-10 began on July 11, 2009 and the host school for the season was Far Eastern University.

UST finished fourth at the end of the double round-robin eliminations. They won six games against eight losses. The Growling Tigers were on back-to-back losses going into their final match of the eliminations. The De La Salle Green Archers who were a game behind them on a 5–8 win–loss record could end up in a tie and eliminate the Tigers due to a superior +13 quotient.

They went on to lose against the UE Red Warriors, but the NU Bulldogs had indirectly helped them qualify for the playoffs by beating La Salle who eventually finished the eliminations with a 5–9 record.

The Tigers made it back to the Final Four after missing out on the playoffs in Season 71 but lost to the No. 1-ranked Ateneo Blue Eagles, who had a twice-to-beat advantage over them.

They had an average winning margin of 9.3 points and an average losing margin of 12.9 points.

They experienced a 27-point blowout loss to the FEU Tamaraws and had a double-overtime loss to La Salle, both in the first round.

Team captain Dylan Ababou was named Most Valuable Player and scoring leader of the season, while Jeric Teng won the Rookie of the Year award. Ababaou was also chosen Player of the Week by the UAAP Press Corps for the duration of July 23–26 when he topscored for the Tigers with 28 points in their 92–88 win over UE.

Roster

Depth chart

Roster changes 
All but two of the players from the Season 69 champion team have graduated. Season 70 MVP Jervy Cruz, point guard Japs Cuan, former team captain Francis Allera, Mel Gile, and centers Badong Canlas and Chester Taylor have all used up their playing years and the only members remaining from the team are Dylan Ababou, who is set to lead the team as this year's captain and returning forward AC Marquez.

Ababou will be joined by veterans Khasim Mirza, Chris Camus, and Allein Maliksi who has recovered from an ACL injury the previous year. The team will have eight new players composed of rookies and members of the Team B training pool.

Subtractions

Additions

Coaching staff 
Beaujing Acot, the Growling Tigers' assistant coach for defense has resigned from his post. He had informed head coach Pido Jarencio of his decision through a text message a month before the UAAP tournament began. He had coached the Tigers during their preseason games in the summer but had stopped showing up to practices after.

Assistant coach Rabbi Tomacruz has also left the coaching staff to concentrate on his studies. The former UST Glowing Goldie who was in charge of liaisons and training of the Tigers' Team B has decided to pursue a career in nursing.

Acot's tasks will be divided between Jarencio and Senen Dueñas, the team's assistant coach for offense. Gina Francisco, former team captain of the UST senior women's basketball team will assume Tomacruz's duties in the team.

Schedule and results

Preseason tournaments 

The Nike Summer League games were aired on Studio 23.

UAAP games 

Elimination games were played in a double round-robin format. All games were aired on Studio 23 and Balls.

Postseason tournament 

Notes

UAAP statistics

Eliminations 

|- bgcolor=#ffffdd
| Dylan Ababou || 14 || || style=|32.9 || 98 || 240 || 40.8% || 15 || 56 || 26.8% || 57 || 81 || 70.4% || 7.1 || 2.2 || 0.9 || 0.4 || 2.4 || style=|18.9
|-
| Khasim Mirza || 14 || || 30.3 || 70 || 182 || 38.5% || 14 || 62 || 22.6% || 35 || 55 || 63.6% || style=|8.8 || 1.8 || 0.6 || 0.8 || 2.9 || 13.5
|- bgcolor=#ffffdd
| Jeric Teng || 14 || || 23.4 || 49|| 119 || 41.2% || 14 || 55 || 25.5% || 48 || 61 || 78.7% || 4.4 || 1.6 || 0.9 || 0.2 || 2.1 || 11.4
|-
| Jeric Fortuna || 13 || || 31.4 || 35 || 89 || 39.3% || 21 || 41 || style=|51.2% || 14 || 16 || 87.5% || 3.1 || style=|4.0 || 1.5 || 0.2 || 2.8 || 8.1
|- bgcolor=#ffffdd
| Allein Maliksi || 11 || || 14.3 || 29 || 81 || 35.8% || 10 || 28 || 35.7% || 20 || 25 || 80.0% || 4.3 || 0.5 || 0.4 || 0.2 || 2.0 || 8.0
|-
| Tata Bautista || 14 || || 16.4 || 32 || 97 || 33.0% || 31 || 78 || 39.7% || 14 || 16 || 87.5% || 1.9 || 1.9 || 0.6 || 0.0 || 1.2 || 7.2
|- bgcolor=#ffffdd
| Chris Camus || 14 || || 23.6 || 36 || 74 || 48.6% || 0 || 3 || 0.0% || 27 || 39 || 69.2% || 6.7 || 0.9 || style=|1.6 || style=|1.5 || 0.9 || 7.1
|-
| Melo Afuang || 14 || || 14.4 || 19 || 52 || 36.5% || 1 || 5 || 20.0% || 8 || 13 || 61.5% || 2.6 || 0.3 || 0.4 || 0.1 || 1.2 || 3.4
|- bgcolor=#ffffdd
| Darell Green || 12 || || 7.4 || 8 || 26 || 30.8% || 0 || 0 || 0.0% || 4 || 6 || 66.7% || 1.8 || 0.1 || 0.2 || 0.0 || 0.8 || 1.7
|-
| Aljon Mariano || 10 || || 4.3 || 3 || 11 || 27.3% || 0 || 2 || 0.0% || 4 || 6 || 66.7% || 0.8 || 0.1 || 0.0 || 0.1 || 0.8 || 1.0
|- bgcolor=#ffffdd
| Eddie Aytona || 12 || || 5.2 || 4 || 15 || 26.7% || 2 || 9 || 22.2% || 0 || 0 || 0.0% || 0.3 || 0.5 || 0.0 || 0.1 || 0.7 || 0.8
|-
| Marco Cam || 6 || || 1.7 || 1 || 3 || 33.3% || 0 || 0 || 0.0% || 2 || 2 || style=|100.0% || 0.8 || 0.0 || 0.2 || 0.0 || 0.0 || 0.7
|- bgcolor=#ffffdd
| Andrew Felix || 6 || || 2.5 || 1 || 2 || style=|50.0% || 0 || 0 || 0.0% || 0 || 0 || 0.0% || 0.7 || 0.0 || 0.0 || 0.0 || 0.8 || 0.3
|-
| Aljohn Ungria || 9 || || 3.1 || 0 || 4 || 0.0% || 0 || 1 || 0.0% || 1 || 2 || 50.0% || 0.4 || 0.0 || 0.1 || 0.0 || 0.2 || 0.1
|- bgcolor=#ffffdd
| AC Marquez || 4 || || 2.8 || 0 || 2 || 0.0% || 0 || 0 || 0.0% || 0 || 0 || 0.0% || 0.8 || 0.0 || 0.3 || 0.3 || 0.8 || 0.0
|-
| Hadi Rushdy || 3 || || 1.0 || 0 || 0 || 0.0% || 0 || 0 || 0.0% || 0 || 0 || 0.0% || 0.0 || 0.0 || 0.0 || 0.0 || 0.0 || 0.0
|- class=sortbottom
! Total || 14 ||  || 40.7 || 385 || 997 || 38.6% || 103 || 343 || 30.0% || 231 || 322 || 71.7% || 44.4 || 14.9 || 7.1 || 3.7 || 18.5 || 78.6
|- class=sortbottom
! Opponents || 14 ||  || 40.7 || 406 || 993 || 40.9% || 110 || 375 || 29.3% || 240 || 399 || 60.2% || 41.2 || 16.5 || 6.1 || 5.1 || 16.8 || 82.1
|}

Playoffs 

|- bgcolor=#ffffdd
| Dylan Ababou || 1 || || style=|38 || 6 || 18 || 33.3% || 3 || 11 || 27.3% || 4 || 6 || 66.7% || 8 || 1 || 0 || 0 || 5 || style=|19
|-
| Khasim Mirza || 1 || || 31 || 3 || 12 || 25.0% || 2 || 8 || 25.0% || 6 || 8 || 75.0% || style=|11 || 2 || 1 || style=|1 || 3 || 14
|- bgcolor=#ffffdd
| Jeric Teng || 1 || || 22 || 3 || 11 || 27.3% || 2 || 6 || style=|33.3% || 2 || 2 || style=|100.0% || 4 || 0 || 0 || style=|1 || 2 || 10
|-
| Tata Bautista || 1 || || 22 || 2 || 7 || 28.6% || 2 || 6 || style=|33.3% || 5 || 8 || 62.5% || 3 || 0 || 0 || 0 || 2 || 9
|- bgcolor=#ffffdd
| Jeric Fortuna || 1 || || 35 || 3 || 11 || 27.3% || 0 || 5 || 0.0% || 1 || 2 || 50.0% || 6 || style=|4 || style=|2 || 0 || 4 || 7
|-
| Melo Afuang || 1 || || 17 || 2 || 4 || style=|50.0% || 0 || 0 || 0.0% || 0 || 0 || 0.0% || 4 || 0 || 1 || 0 || 0 || 4
|- bgcolor=#ffffdd
| Chris Camus || 1 || || 19 || 0 || 2 || 0.0% || 0 || 2 || 0.0% || 1 || 2 || 50.0% || 4 || 0 || 0 || style=|1 || 0 || 1
|-
| Allein Maliksi || 1 || || 15 || 0 || 0 || 0.0% || 0 || 2 || 0.0% || 0 || 0 || 0.0% || 5 || 0 || 0 || 0 || 5 || 0
|- bgcolor=#ffffdd
| Eddie Aytona || 1 || || 1 || 0 || 0 || 0.0% || 0 || 0 || 0.0% || 0 || 0 || 0.0% || 0 || 0 || 0 || 0 || 0 || 0
|- class=sortbottom
! Total || 1 ||  || 40.0 || 19 || 69 || 27.5% || 9 || 40 || 22.5% || 19 || 28 || 67.9% || 43 || 8 || 4 || 3 || 21 || 64
|- class=sortbottom
! Opponents || 1 ||  || 40.0 || 30 || 59 || 50.8% || 6 || 16 || 37.5% || 14 || 21 || 66.7% || 40 || 21 || 14 || 3 || 19 || 81
|}

Source: inboundPASS

Awards

Players drafted into the PBA

References 

UST Growling Tigers basketball team seasons